BTD may refer to:
Back to December, A song by American singer-songwriter Taylor Swift from her 3rd studio album Speak Now.
BTD (Before the Dawn)
Bloons Tower Defense, the tower defense series by Ninja Kiwi.
Biotinidase, the enzyme that in humans is encoded by the BTD gene.
British trade dollar, a silver coin minted by Great Britain to facilitate trade with the Far East.
Douglas BTD Destroyer, 1940s American torpedo/dive-bomber.
Built to Destroy (Michael Schenker Group album), the fourth album by the Michael Schenker Group
Built to Destroy (Incite album), the fifth album by Incite